Xieyi is an album by Swedish bassist and composer Anders Jormin recorded in 1999 and released on the ECM label.

Reception

The BBC Music review by Peter Marsh called it an "impressive and rewarding release".

Track listing
All compositions by Anders Jormin except as indicated
 "Choral" - 1:45
 "Giv Mig Ej Glans - Hymn 433" (Jean Sibelius) - 6:03
 "I Denna Ljuva Sommartid - Hymn 200" (Nathan Söderblom) - 4:51
 "Gracias a la Vida" (Violeta Parra) - 2:57
 "Idas Sommarvisa" (Georg Riedel) - 6:04
 "Xieyi" - 0:52
 "Decimas" - 5:34
 "Och Kanske Är Det Natt" (Stefan Forssén) - 4:10
 "Sul Tasto" - 1:14
 "Tenk" - 8:43
 "Sonett till Cornelis" (Forssén) - 5:28
 "Romance-Distance" - 1:08
 "Scents" - 3:02
 "Fragancia" (Evert Taube) - 4:10
 "Q" - 2:12
 "War Orphans" (Ornette Coleman) - 7:51
 "Choral" - 1:47  
Recorded in the Artisten in Göteborg, Sweden on December 17, 1999 and October 2, 2000 at Studio Bohus in Kungälv, Sweden.

Personnel
Anders Jormin — bass
Robin Rydqvist — trumpet, flugelhorn (tracks 1, 6, 9, 12, 15 & 17)
Lars-Goran Carlsson — trombone (tracks 1, 6, 9, 12, 15 & 17)
Nicolas Rydh — bass trombone (tracks 1, 6, 9, 12, 15 & 17)
Krister Petersson — French horn (tracks 1, 6, 9, 12, 15 & 17)

References

Anders Jormin albums
2001 albums
Albums produced by Manfred Eicher
ECM Records albums